A House Built on Water is a 2001 Iranian film written, produced and directed by Bahman Farman-Ara. Starring Reza Kianian, Hedieh Tehrani, Ezzatolah Entezami, Jamshid Mashayekhi, Bita Farrahi and Behnaz Jafari.

Plot
At the beginning of the film, the main character injures a young angel with his car in an accident on a road. The viewers understand from the start that the film deals with surrealism and mystic work. However, there is not much of this; more than 90% of the film reflects only touchable realities. The protagonist, Dr. Sepid-bakht (literary: blank-future, good-fortune, or good-end), a middle-aged gynaecologist, has good, no-good and bad attributes – as do most humans. Sepid-bakht, having made many mistakes in the past and being lonely now, accidentally becomes acquainted with an eight-year-old boy who knows the entire text of the Quran by heart and suddenly goes in coma. This is perhaps why the first name of the film was Coma and why Farman-Ara described the future film as "the history of society in collective coma" in an interview.

The doctor, who now experiences "free fall in the life", for instance, caused infertility to his secretary-love in the past, who no way pardons him because of what he did to her when she was even younger. Among the social problems the film exhibits are narcotism of youngsters, prostitution and AIDS. Somewhere in the film, the doctor responds to someone who just called him his last hope with "(So) We are in a shit world, when I am someone's last hope." Western film critics already compared some socio-satirical attributes of the films of Farman-Ara with those of Woody Allen.

The doctor still sympathizes with his ex-beloved, who now is a head-nurse and must undergo chemotherapy because of a severe disease; with a young girl, who recently understood that she suffers from AIDS; and with his son, who suffers from addiction to narcotic drugs.

This film of Farman-Ara was well received by the judges of the International Fajr Film-Festival of Tehran (2002) and won many prizes, i.e. as the best Iranian film and because of the best actor (Reza Kianian).

Cast
 Dr. Sepid-bakht: Reza Kianian
 Doctor's father: Ezzat-ol-lah Entezami
 Doctor's son, Mani: Mehdi Safavi
 Doctor's secretary: Hedye Tehrani
Doctor Latifi: Jamshid Mashayekhi
 Head-nurse: Bita Farrahi
 Girl with AIDS: Behnaz Jafari
Mrs Mohammadi: Roya Nonahali

References

This material first appeared in Esperanto-language article in Iranian Esperantist, n-ro 11, year 4, Spring 2005, 56 p., p. 4-8.: Like a small kiss by Shima Bastani. Here are its sources:

BAHARLU, Abbas.  (Hundred faces of Iranian movie), Tehran: Naŝre ghatre, 2002, 208 p.
 http://www.golshirifoundation.org
 http://www.nyu.edu/greyart/exhibits/iran
 https://web.archive.org/web/20080502230729/http://www.citypaper.net/movies/s/smellofcamphor.shtml
 http://www.reel.com/reel.asp?node=features/interviews/farmanara
 https://web.archive.org/web/20160112071833/http://www.filmref.com/directors/dirpages/farmanara.html

External links

Iranian drama films
Crystal Simorgh for Best Film winners